William Yates (5 August 1880 – 27 December 1967) was a British racewalker. He competed in the 10 km walk at the 1912 Summer Olympics.

References

1880 births
1967 deaths
British male racewalkers
Olympic athletes of Great Britain
Athletes (track and field) at the 1912 Summer Olympics